The Millionaire or The Millionaires may refer to:

Film and television
 The Millionaire (1917 film), a silent comedy film featuring Oliver Hardy
 The Millionaire (1921 film), an American silent drama film
 The Millionaire (1927 film), directed by Oscar Micheaux
 The Millionaire (1931 film), a comedy film starring George Arliss 
 The Millionaire (1947 film), a German comedy film
 The Millionaire (1950 film), an Egyptian comedy film
 The Millionaire (TV series), a 1955–1960 television drama anthology series
 The Millionaire, a 1978 TV movie starring Martin Balsam, based on the TV series
 The Millionairess (play), a 1936 play by George Bernard Shaw
 The Millionairess, a 1960 romantic comedy starring Peter Sellers and Sophia Loren

Music
 The Millionaires (band), a Dutch pop group
 Millionaires (duo), an American electronic music duo
 "The Millionaire", member of musical group Combustible Edison
 "The Millionaire", a 1975 song by the band Dr. Hook

Other uses
 The Millionaire (calculator), a 19th-century mechanical calculator
 The Millionaires, a 2002 novel by Brad Meltzer
 Thurston Howell III, a character on the U.S. television sitcom Gilligan's Island

See also
 Millionaire (disambiguation)